Duras may refer to:

Places
 Albanian city of Durrës (obsolete French spelling) 
 Duras, Lot-et-Garonne, a commune of the Lot-et-Garonne département in France
 , a constituent village of the commune of Sint-Truiden in the Belgian province of Limburg

People
 County of Duras, a noble family in the 11th and 12th centuries whose seat was Duras, Belgium
 Duras (Dacian king) (ruled c.69-87), king of Dacia who attacked the Roman empire
 Marguerite Duras (1914–1996), pseudonym of Marguerite Donnadieu, a French writer and film director
 Claire de Duras (1777–1828), a French writer
 Oldřich Duras or Důras (1882–1957), Czech chess International Grandmaster
 Důras, Czech surname

Other 
 Duras (grape), a red wine grape from Tarn in France
 House of Duras, in Star Trek, a house in the Klingon Empire